Borna Barišić (born 10 November 1992) is a Croatian professional footballer who plays as a left-back for Scottish Premiership club Rangers and Croatia national team. Barišić previously played for Osijek in the Prva HNL.

Club career 
Barišić was born in Osijek in eastern Croatian region of Slavonia to Bosnian Croat parents. His father Stipe "Moljac" Barišić hails from Galečić, while his mother Verica hails from Stražbenica. He joined the youth academy of Osijek in 2003, spending eight years with the side. After failing to break into the first team, Barišić moved to nearby BSK Bijelo Brdo.

Osijek 
After a single season with Bijelo Brdo, Barišić returned to Osijek. In his first season with the first team, Barišić managed 23 Prva HNL appearances, debuting on 12 July 2013 in a 3–1 loss to Dinamo Zagreb. Barišić first goal for Osijek came on 4 April 2014 in the form on an 88th minute winner against Lokomotiva. Osijek finished in 8th place in the 2013–14 season. The following season, Barišić played in 28 games, managing one goal and two assists from left back as Osijek narrowly avoided relegation.

Dinamo Zagreb and Lokomotiva 
Despite his club's struggles, Barišić's performance for Osijek in the 2014–15 season saw him earn a move to league champions Dinamo, signing a five-year contract. Barišić's made his debut for his new club against his former club Osijek on 19 July 2015. In late August, however, Barišić was loaned out to Dinamo's feeder club Lokomotiva. At Lokomotiva, Barišić made 19 league appearances, managing two assists.

Return to Osijek 
Osijek were purchased in February 2016 by Hungarian oligarch Lőrinc Mészáros and Croatian entrepreneur Ivan Meštrović, the first time the club had gone into private ownership. The new ownership identified Barišić as the type of player they want representing the club; young, talented and produced by the youth academy. Barišić subsequently agreed to the transfer and was appointed captain of his junior club. Barišić made his returning debut for Osijek on 23 July 2016, captaining the club to a 2–0 win over Inter Zaprešić. Barišić made 32 league appearances, scoring once and assisting seven times as Osijek finished 4th, its highest league finish in nearly 10 years.

In summer 2017, Barišić drew attention from Ukrainian club Dynamo Kyiv, and he agreed personal terms with the club. However, at the last minute, Dynamo opted for Dinamo Zagreb's Josip Pivarić. In an interview with Sportske novosti on 11 August, Barišić publicly called out Dinamo for sabotaging the transfer. On 22 August, Dinamo Zagreb executive Zdravko Mamić was shot in his native village of Zidine, Bosnia and Herzegovina. The shooting was believed to be an assassination attempt organized by the Čepin Mafia clan, of which Barišić's father Stipe is a member.

In the 2017–18 UEFA Europa League qualifying, Barišić scored a penalty in a 1–0 away win for Osijek over PSV Eindhoven. Osijek would go on to win the home leg 1–0, knocking out PSV from the competition. Barišić made 22 appearances in the league, scoring once and assisting four times as the club again finished in fourth place.

Rangers
On 7 August 2018, Barišić signed a four year deal with Rangers after a deal was agreed with Osijek for a reported £2.2 million. He signed having just played against Rangers in the 2018–19 UEFA Europa League qualifying phase.

After an injury hit first season, on 29 December 2019, Barišić assisted both goals and was named Man of the Match in a 2–1 victory over Celtic, the first win at Celtic Park for Rangers since 2010. On 30 January 2020, he signed a new contract that sees him stay at the club until 2024.

On 18 February 2021, in his hundredth appearance for the club, Barišić scored a brace from the penalty spot in a 4–3 away win over Royal Antwerp in the Europa League Round of 32.

International career
He made his Croatia national team debut on 11 January 2017 in a friendly against Chile. In May 2018, he was named in Croatia's preliminary 32-man squad for the 2018 World Cup in Russia but did not make the final 23.

He scored his debut international goal on 21 March 2019 in a home Euro 2020 qualifier against Azerbaijan, that ended as a 2–1 win. By the end of qualifying, he solidified his spot in the national team's starting XI.

Career statistics

Club

International

Scores and results list Croatia's goal tally first, score column indicates score after each Barišić goal.

Honours

Dinamo Zagreb
Prva HNL: 2015–16

Rangers
Scottish Premiership: 2020–21
Scottish Cup: 2021–22
Scottish League Cup runner-up: 2019–20
 UEFA Europa League runner-up: 2021–22

Croatia
FIFA World Cup third place: 2022

Individual
Croatian First Football League Team of the Year: 2016–17
 PFA Scotland Team of the Year: 2020–21 Scottish Premiership

References

External links

1992 births
Living people
Footballers from Osijek
Association football fullbacks
Croatian footballers
Croatia international footballers
NK BSK Bijelo Brdo players
NK Osijek players
GNK Dinamo Zagreb players
NK Lokomotiva Zagreb players
Rangers F.C. players
Second Football League (Croatia) players
Croatian Football League players
Scottish Professional Football League players
UEFA Euro 2020 players
2022 FIFA World Cup players
Croatian expatriate footballers
Expatriate footballers in Scotland
Croatian expatriate sportspeople in Scotland